
Andrew Emerson Unsworth (born 1970) is an American organist who has served an organist for the Salt Lake Tabernacle since 2007, which includes being an organist for the Tabernacle Choir at Temple Square, which is the principal resident musical organization there.

Unsworth holds a bachelor's degree in organ performance and pedagogy from Brigham Young University, as well as master's and doctoral degrees from Duke University. From 2001 to 2006 he was the organist for the Cathedral of the Madeleine in Salt Lake City. Prior to becoming a Tabernacle organist, Unsworth was an assistant professor of music history and organ at Stephen F. Austin State University.

He married Alison Giauque and they are the parents of five children. He is a member of the Church of Jesus Christ of Latter-day Saints, and was a missionary in the church's England London Mission.

Awards
 Associateship Prize (2010), American Guild of Organists

Works

See also
List of Mormon Tabernacle Choir organists
Salt Lake Tabernacle organ

References

Further reading
 
Cathedral of the Madeline article about Unsworth being Tabernacle Organist
 Fulfilling an Organist's Dream 

20th-century Mormon missionaries
Latter Day Saints from North Carolina
American Mormon missionaries in England
Brigham Young University alumni
Duke University alumni
Living people
Tabernacle Choir organists
Stephen F. Austin State University faculty
Latter Day Saints from Utah
Latter Day Saints from Texas
Latter Day Saints from New York (state)
21st-century organists
1970 births